Municipal elections were held in municipalities across Ontario, Canada on November 14, 1988 to elect mayors, reeves, councillors and school trustees.

Results

Brantford

Source for election returns:  Hamilton Spectator, 15 November 1988.

See also

1988 Toronto municipal election
1988 Ottawa municipal election
1988 Hamilton, Ontario municipal election
1988 Windsor municipal election

References

 
Ontario municipal elections